Hoplocorypha ugandana is a species of praying mantis found in Uganda.

See also
List of mantis genera and species

References

Hoplocorypha
Mantodea of Africa
Insects of Uganda
Insects described in 1930